John Lawrence Sonderegger (December 8, 1914 – March 25, 1992) was an American businessman and politician.

Born in Milwaukee, Wisconsin, he was educated in the Milwaukee school system. In 1940, Sonderegger received his doctorate degree in business from University of Wisconsin–Madison. In 1936, he started to work for Rennebohm Drug Store and became the company's secretary and comptroller. On August 19, 1947, Acting Governor of Wisconsin Oscar Rennebohm appointed Sonderegger Wisconsin State Treasurer because of the death of John M. Smith. He resigned on September 30, 1948 to become Wisconsin state insurance commissioner. Sonderegger worked at several other companies and help with the merger of Rennebohm Drug Stores with Walgreens. He also served on the board of trustees of the Oscar Rennebohm Foundation.

Sonderegger died while vacationing in Tucson, Arizona in 1992.

Notes

External links

John L. Sonderegger

1914 births
1992 deaths
Politicians from Madison, Wisconsin
Politicians from Milwaukee
University of Wisconsin–Madison alumni
State treasurers of Wisconsin
Businesspeople from Milwaukee
20th-century American businesspeople
20th-century American politicians
Businesspeople from Madison, Wisconsin